The GP Viborg is a cycling race held in Denmark. It is part of UCI Europe Tour in category 1.2. It was known as Destination Thy in 2013 and 2014.

Winners

References

Cycle races in Denmark
2013 establishments in Denmark
Recurring sporting events established in 2013
UCI Europe Tour races
Spring (season) events in Denmark